The 2009–10 season was Nottingham Forest's second season in the Football League Championship, following promotion from League One in the 2007–08 season, and after spending three years in the third tier.

Team kit

|
|

Club officials
Board of Directors

Technical staff

Pre-season and friendlies

Summary

In preparation for the 2009–10 campaign, Forest released seven fringe players. Richard Tait, Hamza Bencherif, Liam Hook, Tom Sharpe, Ryan Whitehurst, Emile Sinclair and Paddy Gamble were all released with Sinclair the only player to make first team appearances. Ian Breckin was also told he would play no part next season. Another three fringe players were given new contracts, Mickael Darnet, Shane Redmond and Arron Mitchell. Forest then signed three players in two days in late June. Striker David McGoldrick signed for £1m from Southampton, whilst fellow striker Dele Adebola rejected a new contract offer from Bristol City to sign a two-year deal for The Reds As well as this,  winger Paul Anderson signed a three-year deal for £250,000 from Liverpool, after spending the previous season on loan at The Reds. Goalkeeper Lee Camp became Forest's fourth signing of the summer on 3 July, signing for £150,000 from QPR, with the highly rated keeper committing himself to a four-year deal with the club. Youngsters Shane Redmond and James Reid headed out of the City Ground for six-month loans to Burton Albion and Rushden & Diamonds respectively on 7 July. Forest announced a day later that their shirt sponsors for the season would be gaming company Victor Chandler, with the one-year contract seeing Forest receive a substantial six-figure sum.
On Thursday 16 July, Forest announced their full list of squad numbers for the 09/10 season.

The Reds then kicked off their pre-season campaign with a 1–0 victory over Portuguese outfit Sporting Lisbon, with Paul Anderson netting the winner in the 79th minute for Forest.
A week later Forest sent out two teams to play Burton Albion and Ilkeston Town. The first team beat Burton 4–1 with McGoldrick netting his first goal and Tyson bagging a hat-trick, whilst a young and inexperienced team lost 2–1 to Ilkeston, Tim Hopkinson scoring a late consolation penalty. On 20 July Nottingham Forest completed the signings of Chris Gunter and Paul McKenna for £1.75 million and £750,000 respectively. Mark Byrne was also sent out on loan to Rushden and Diamonds for six months. On 21 July a deal was completed to bring back Joel Lynch, who spent a large amount of time on loan at Forest last season. Along with Forest's payment of around £200,000, Matt Thornhill was sent out on loan to Brighton & Hove Albion for 6 months. On 22 July Forest signed Dexter Blackstock from QPR for on a 4-year deal. This bolstered Davies' attacking options to six strikers. They continued their spending on the 22nd by bringing in Polish Midfielder Radoslaw Majewski on a season-long loan deal with an option to buy him included. Later that day Forest sent two teams out in pre-season friendlies, one to face Rotherham United, the other to face Rushden and Diamonds. The first team squad was mixed between the 2 matches as one side beat Rotherham 1–0 with Earnshaw's first goal of the pre-season while the other drew 1–1 with Diamonds thanks to a goal from Majewski on his debut scored after just 90 seconds. Three days later was the traditional match between Forest and local rivals Notts County, who has just been taken over by the Munto Finance group. The result was 2–1 to County despite late pressure from Forest that saw McGugan get a goal, this surprised many people who had expected Forest to easily win. Forest finished their pre-season fixtures with two impressive results at home against Premier League opposition. The first a 1–1 draw against Stoke City and the second, two days later, a 2–1 victory against Birmingham City.

Results

Football League Championship

Summary

Forest began the season with a 0–0 draw at Reading, the same as their previous season. Forest then picked up their first win of the season a few days later with a 3–0 victory in the League Cup over League Two Bradford City, with Paul Anderson, Dexter Blackstock and Lewis McGugan all getting their names onto the scoresheet. However, their first home league game of the season ended in a 1–0 defeat to West Bromwich Albion, due to an own goal by Wes Morgan and Robert Earnshaw missed a penalty for Forest. Forest then suffered their second home defeat of the week, a 4–2 loss against Watford. The following Saturday saw Forest pick up a point in a 1–1 draw away to Q.P.R, with a goal from David McGoldrick in the second half. The next fixture was a midweek League Cup tie against Middlesbrough at the City Ground. Forest won 2–1 after extra time, after Chambers scored from a corner in the 60th minute and Radoslaw Majewski scored his first goal for Forest in the 103 minute. Next up was the East Midlands derby against rivals Derby County. Forest were looking to beat Derby for the first time since 2003, and they got off to a perfect start when Majewski fired the Reds in front after just 58 seconds. Forest made it 2–0 after 28 minutes, Dexter Blackstock with the goal. Nathan Tyson made it 3–0, just three minutes before half time. However Derby were not done yet when a Wes Morgan own goal and Jake Livermore goal had Derby back into the game. Forest held onto the win but it was after the game that made the headlines with Nathan Tyson celebrating the win by parading a corner flag, emblazoned with the Forest emblem, across the away fans. Tyson, and Forest as a whole, argued that the gesture was celebratory and the move across the away fans was so Tyson could salute the home fans above and at the other end of the away end. The Derby contingent disagreed, believing that the gesture was inflammatory. Derby players and staff clashed with Forest players and staff. The FA charged Forest and Derby with "failing to control their players", while Tyson was charged with improper conduct. Tyson pleaded guilty to his charge, as did Derby. Forest pleaded not guilty. The FA fined Forest £25,000 and Derby £20,000, with £10,000 suspended for both. Tyson was fined £5,000 and given a two-game ban which was suspended.

September started with consecutive 1–1 draws against Sheffield Wednesday and Ipswich Town. However Forest were then up against high-flying Blackpool and suffered a 1–0 defeat before going out of the League Cup by the same scoreline to Blackburn Rovers. But a 1–0 win over struggling Plymouth Argyle gave Forest a new lease of life and they made it consecutive wins after a 2–0 win over Scunthorpe United. In October, Forest moved up to 10th place, their highest position in the Football League since the 2003/04 season, after a 2–1 victory over Darren Ferguson's, Peterborough United. Forest then defeated Newcastle United, who were then in second place in the table, at home to gain their fourth consecutive win and consign the Toon to only their second defeat of the season. An injury-time winner from Guy Moussi saw Forest to their fifth-consecutive win, against Barnsley at home. However, after this Moussi was sent off for a second bookable offence, for celebrating with the Forest fans in the Trent End. Forest ended the month with a 1–1 draw away at Crystal Palace after coming from behind. November started where October left off with two 1–1 draws against Cardiff City and Bristol City. Lewis McGugan rescued a point with an injury-time equaliser against Cardiff, with Wes Morgan scoring a late goal against Bristol City, who pulled level later in the game. The next match saw Forest play Middlesbrough away. An early goal from the home team saw Forest on the back foot but a free kick in second half from Robert Earnshaw saw Forest to their fourth-successive 1–1 draw. The week after Forest introduced a 'mixed area' of fans, where fans of both Forest and Doncaster could sit together. After selling out this allocation, they went on to record their biggest win of the season, at that stage, with a 4–1 victory. This also saw Nicky Shorey make his debut for the Reds. Forest kick started December with an impressive 5–1 victory over East Midlands neighbours Leicester City, including a Robert Earnshaw hat-trick. Forest then claimed a draw at Sheffield United before going to win at Swansea City and beat Preston at home, Billy Davies' and Paul McKenna's former club who scored the first goal. The Christmas period saw Forest get a draw away at Watford and a win at home against Coventry City. January began with a very important win over promotion rivals West Bromwich Albion. Blackstock, Majewski and Cohen all got on the scoresheet as the Reds won 3–1 to help them leap frog West Brom into second place. The month continued to be good as Forest beat Reading 2–1 and thumped QPR 5–0 at home to help them stay in second place.  However the month ended in disaster as Forest lost away for the first time in the season to local rivals Derby County 1–0. This saw their 19-game unbeaten run come to an end. This, coupled with the FA Cup exit, saw mixed emotions through the month. Forest bounced back in February with a win at home to Sheffield Wednesday, thanks to a Dexter Blackstock brace, which saw Forest's impressive home record continue. However, the defeat to Derby away had had its effects. Two away defeats on the bounce to Coventry City and Doncaster Rovers saw the Reds slip down to third, despite being unbeaten away for the earlier parts of the season. Home wins against Sheffield United and Middlesbrough saw Forest back up to 3rd but their away form took another blow as they lost to Leicester City 3–0 away.  March began with an injury time winner from Luke Chambers against Swansea City at home saw Forest mount a push to keep the pressure on second placed WBA but away defeats against Preston North End and Barnsley dented these hopes. A 4th consecutive 1–0 win at home, against Peterborough United, and a 2–0 win against Crystal Palace saw Forest equal Brian Clough's record of twelve consecutive home wins but it was not enough though as West Bromwich Albion got further away in the promotion push. A 7th consecutive away defeat, against table topping Newcastle United, saw most fans condemn themselves to the playoffs and West Brom pulled away even further. April saw Forest gained their first away point in three months against Bristol City thanks to a finish from outside the box from Guy Moussi to draw 1–1. Forest's draw at home to Cardiff 2 days later meant Newcastle were confirmed of promotion. Forest then got an impressive win against Ipswich at home which saw them qualify for the playoffs, but also meant West Brom gained the final automatic promotion place. The following week Forest played Blackpool away, the last team to beat them at home back in September. With Forest already qualified for the playoffs, the starting 11 saw many fringe players in, which saw Forest go on to lose 3–1 with Joe Garner getting the consolation, his first of the season. Forest's last home game of the season was against already relegated Plymouth Argyle, where Forest won 3–0. Forest ended the season with a 2–2 draw, playing Scunthorpe United away.

Results

Results by round

League table

Coca-Cola Championship Playoffs

Summary

Forest qualified for the playoffs after finishing third. Since Blackpool finished sixth it meant they drew each other in the semi-finals, with Cardiff City and Leicester City contesting the other semi. The first leg was at Blackpool's Bloomfield Road ground. Forest started brightly with a superb goal from Chris Cohen from the corner of the area, before Blackpool replied with two goals meaning they took a 2–1 advantage into the second leg. Forest once again started brightly, with Earnshaw levelling the scores on aggregate after 7 minutes. In the second half Blackpool took an aggregate lead, but then Earnshaw levelled again. However, Blackpool then went on to score three more in quick succession. Adebola scored a late consolation in stoppage time, but it was not enough and Forest were knocked out.

Results

League Cup

Summary
Forest were drawn against Bradford City at home, in the First Round of the League Cup. Bradford had lost 5–0 to Forest neighbours Notts County just a few days before and their poor luck continued as they went on to lose 3–0 thanks to goals from Paul Anderson, Dexter Blackstock and Lewis Mcgugan. The Second Round saw Forest get drawn against nearly relegated Middlesbrough. This would prove a tough test for Forest. Forest in at half time losing 1–0. However, after the break Luke Chambers gained a valuable equaliser which saw the match go into extra time. Then in the first period of extra time, Polish international Radosław Majewski bagged a winner to send Forest into the Third Round. Forest were drawn at home again, this time to Premier League side Blackburn Rovers. Forest couldn't continue their cup run and went on to lose 1–0.

Results

FA Cup

Summary

Forest started in the Third Round of the FA Cup, due to them being in the Championship. They were drawn against Premier League Birmingham City. Both sides had very impressive unbeaten runs going into the fixture. The match saw a closely contested match with Joe Hart keeping Birmingham in the competition on more than one occasion. In the second half Forest won a penalty, however this saw Robert Earnshaw blaze it over the bar. The match finished 0–0 meaning a replay at St Andrew's. The match was again closely contested, but this time Birmingham edged the win, defeating Forest 1–0.

Results

Squad statistics

Appearances and goals
The statistics for the following players are for their time during 2009–10 season playing for Nottingham Forest. Any stats from a different club during 2009–10 are not included.
Nottingham Forest have also had two own-goals scored for them during 2009–10
Includes all statistics from the Coca-Cola Championship Play-offs

|-
|}

Top scorers
Includes all competitive matches. The list is sorted by league goals when total goals are equal.

Last updated on 11 May 2010

Disciplinary record
Includes all competitive matches. Players with 1 card or more included only.

Last updated on 11 May 2010

Transfers

In

Out

Loans in

Loans out

References

2008-09
Nottingham Forest